

Events
Undated - The money seized from Captain Kidd, executed only four years before, is presented by Queen Anne to Greenwich Hospital totaling £6,472.
March - Captain Thomas Green and his crew, consisting of 14 officers and crew members, are tried by the High Court of the Admiralty and found guilty of piracy. Green is later hanged at Leith with James Simpson, Henry Keigle and George Haines on April 4 and the remaining crew on April 11 and 18.

Deaths
Lionel Wafer, English buccaneer
April 4 - Thomas Green
April 4 - James Simpson
April 4 - Henry Keigle
April 4 - George Haines

Piracy
Piracy by year
1705 in military history